Exotheca is a monotypic genus of African and Southeast Asian plants in the grass family.

The only known species is Exotheca abyssinica, which has a disjunct (discontinuous) distribution. It is native to Vietnam, Eastern Africa, and Southeastern Africa (from Eritrea to Mozambique).

References

Andropogoneae
Monotypic Poaceae genera
Flora of Africa
Flora of Vietnam